Once Around the World is the seventh single by It Bites. It was written by Francis Dunnery and released in March 1988. The eponymous album signaled a departure from the more directly pop-oriented sound of It Bites' first album, something demonstrated explicitly by this fourteen-minute title track in full progressive rock style.

References 

1988 singles
It Bites songs
1988 songs
Virgin Records singles
Geffen Records singles